Kullorsuaq (old spelling: Kuvdlorssuaq) is a settlement in the Avannaata municipality in northwestern Greenland. It is the northernmost settlement in the Upernavik Archipelago, located on Kullorsuaq Island at the southern end of Melville Bay, itself part of the larger Baffin Bay.

The settlement was founded in 1928 and became a trading station, growing in size after World War II when hunters from several small villages around Inussulik Bay, Sugar Loaf Bay, and Tasiusaq Bay moved into the larger settlements such as Nuussuaq and Kullorsuaq. Today, Kullorsuaq remains one of the most traditional hunting and fishing villages in Greenland, but maintains a stable population.

Geography 

Kullorsuaq is located on an island of the same name at the southern end of Melville Bay. The island is the northernmost part of Upernavik Archipelago.

History

Prehistory 

The Upernavik Archipelago was among the earliest-settled areas of Greenland, the first migrants arriving approximately 4,000 years ago. All southbound migrations of the Inuit passed through the area, leaving behind a trail of archeological sites. These first settlers belong to the Saqqaq culture but were followed around 3,000 years ago by the Dorset culture, which spread along the coast of Baffin Bay. In the 13th and 14th centuries, the Dorset were themselves displaced by the Thule people.

The archipelago has been continuously  but sparsely  inhabited over this period. Migrants in the 19th and early 20th centuries found many ruins of Inuit settlement on Kullorsuaq, Kiatassuaq, and other smaller islands around Melville Bay, although Danish settlers during the colonial era were unaware of Kullorsuaq until the end of 19th century.

20th century 
The modern settlement was initially populated by hunters from now-abandoned villages to Kiatassuaq's south: Inussulik Bay, Sugar Loaf Bay, and Tasiusaq Bay. The initial wave of settlers originated in villages of fewer than 10 people: Ikermiut (abandoned 1954), Itissaalik (abandoned 1957), and Kuuk (abandoned 1972). Several families of hunters from Nuussuaq also moved north to Kullorsuaq, which was founded in 1928.

Between 1930 and 1960, northwestern Greenland underwent a consolidation phase, largely driven by the Danish colonial authorities via Royal Greenland, then part of KNI, which possessed an island-wide monopoly on trade. The mutual agreement between the hunting families and the trade company limited the pre-war northward expansion until the 1950s, when the populations of the smaller settlements reinforced larger communities in Nuussuaq and Kullorsuaq. In 1952, Kullorsuaq became the northernmost trading post in the archipelago with the establishment of its first year-round shop.

In the 1960s, Kullorsuaq was a staging point for further expansion into Savissivik  to the northwest, although this was unsuccessful and most migrants returned south in the 1980s and 1990s. Today, the settlement remains one of the most traditional hunting and fishing villages in Greenland.

The French film “Le voyage au Groenland”  takes place in Kullorsuaq.

Economy 

Fishing  including narwhals and whales  and hunting  including fur seals and walruses  are the primary occupations in the area. The fish processing plant for Upernavik Seafood (a subsidiary of Royal Greenland) and the Pilersuisoq general store are the only organized employers in the settlement.

Kullorsuaq is among the 10 poorest communities in Greenland, as are three other settlements in the archipelago  Naajaat, Nuussuaq, and Upernavik Kujalleq.

Transport 

Air Greenland serves the village as part of a government contract, with twice-weekly helicopter flights to Nuussuaq and Upernavik.

Population 
With 453 inhabitants (2020), Kullorsuaq is the largest settlement in the Upernavik Archipelago outside of Upernavik. It is one of the few settlements in the Avannaata municipality exhibiting significant growth patterns over the course of the last two decades, increasing by over 63% relative to its 1990 level and by almost 16% relative to its 2000 level.

References

Melville Bay
Populated places in Greenland
Populated places of Arctic Greenland
Upernavik Archipelago
1928 establishments in North America
20th-century establishments in Greenland
Populated places established in 1928